Mihkel Kukk (born 8 October 1983, in Jõgeva) is a male javelin thrower from Estonia. His personal best throw is 81.77 metres, achieved in July 2008 in Stockholm.

Achievements

References

1983 births
Living people
Estonian male javelin throwers
Olympic athletes of Estonia
Athletes (track and field) at the 2008 Summer Olympics
World Athletics Championships athletes for Estonia
Sportspeople from Jõgeva